Tambelan archipelago is a group of 68 islands off the west coast of West Kalimantan, (Borneo), Indonesia, just north of the equator. The archipelago is located on the north opening of Karimata Strait which separates Borneo and Belitung island. Geographically it is part of the Tudjuh Archipelago, and administratively forms a district (kecamatan) of Bintan Regency within the Riau Islands Province. It covers a land area of 90.4 km2 and had a population of 4,975 at the 2010 Census. Major islands include Big Tambelan (Tambelan Besar), Mendarik, Uwi, Benua, and Pejantan. The islands are divided into eight administrative villages (kelurahan) - Batu Lepuk, Kampung Hilir, Kampung Melayu, Kukup, Pengikik, Pulau Mentebung, Pulau Pinang and Teluk Sekuni.

See also

 Anambas Islands
 Badas Islands
 Natuna Islands

Further reading
 National Geospatial-intelligence Agency (2005) "Borneo: Northwest Coast and Kepulauan Tudjuh" Sailing directions (enroute): Borneo, Jawa, Sulawesi, and Nusa Tenggara United States National Geospatial-Intelligence Agency

External links
 Archipiélago de Tambelan (Spanish)

References

Tudjuh Archipelago
Populated places in Indonesia